John D. Heimick (December 10, 1899 – July 23, 1949), was a member of the Wisconsin State Assembly.

Born in Milwaukee, Wisconsin.

Career
Heimick was elected to the Assembly in 1942 and remained a member until his death. He was a Republican.

References

Politicians from Milwaukee
Republican Party members of the Wisconsin State Assembly
1899 births
1949 deaths
20th-century American politicians